Near Here is a public art work by American artist Paul Druecke, located on the facade of the Peck School of the Arts Kenilworth Building, part of University of Wisconsin–Milwaukee on the east side of Milwaukee, Wisconsin. The artwork is a bronze plaque with a poetic text created by Donna Stonecipher. It is located at 2155 North Prospect Avenue.

References

Outdoor sculptures in Milwaukee
2011 sculptures
Bronze sculptures in Wisconsin